Happy Hour is the fifth studio album by experimental music band King Missile, and released on December 15, 1992, by Atlantic Records. The album is exactly one hour long, hence its title.

Reception

Ned Raggett of AllMusic wrote that "due in part to the return of Kramer to production – or in this case co-production – duties, along with a slew of more immediately memorable songs, Happy Hour trumps The Way to Salvation as the peak of the band's high-profile days, an inspired collection of tunes ranging from deranged pop to full-on epic metal stomp." The critic also said "thanks to a catchy arrangement via Rick's clipped, stuttered guitar riff and the sweetly sung title phrase in the background, the result is giddy left-field nonsense." and "it's the blessed liveliness of the whole album – at a premium in the days of full-on grunge when it came out, still rare enough years later – that makes it stand up so well." Trouser Press said "Hall's surreal accounts have the vivid sense of purpose previously absent; he’s not aiming at eliciting wan smiles, he’s trying to provoke intelligent thought" and "meanwhile, the band (drummer Roger Murdock is that new face in the booklet photo) locks into diverse rock grooves that would be worth hearing even without the vocals."  Robert Christgau chose the band's hit single "Detachable Penis" as the album's "choice cut".

Track listing

Personnel
Adapted from the Happy Hour liner notes.

King Missile
 John S. Hall – lead vocals, production
 Dave Rick – guitar, production
 Roger Murdock – drums, percussion, keyboards, Emulator, production, guitar (17)
 Chris Xefos – bass guitar, keyboards, percussion, backing vocals, production

Additional performers
Mal Rick – clarinet (17)

Production and design
 Annalisa – photography
 Tom Bouman – design
 Jola Hesselberth – cover art
 Ron Jaramillo – design
 Mark Kramer – production, Mellotron (9), bass guitar (17)
 Inge Schaap – art direction
 Steve Watson – production, assistant engineering

Charts

Release history

References

External links 
 

King Missile albums
Atlantic Records albums
1992 albums
Albums produced by Kramer (musician)